Homelessness in South Africa dates back to the apartheid period. Increasing unemployment, lack of affordable housing, social disintegration, and social and economic policies have all been identified as contributing factors to the issue. Some scholars argue that solutions to homelessness in South Africa lie more within the private sphere than in the legal and political spheres.

There is no national census on homeless people in South Africa, researchers instead rely on individual studies of homeless persons in particular cities. The South African homeless population has been estimated at approximately 200,000.

One study found that three out of four South African metropolitan municipalities viewed homelessness primarily as a social dependency issue, responding with social interventions. At the same time, homeless South Africans indicated that the most important thing the municipality could assist them with was employment and well-located affordable housing.

History

Early history through the 1800s 

In the 19th century the main issues for the colonies was of squatting and vagrancy after much of the land was taken by white people to be farmed. Mid 19th century, under the colonial rule efforts were made to remove non-white people from white owned property, causing the displacement and a large wandering population looking for work.

The introduction of Cape's Vagrancy and Squatting Act (1878) and other legislation passed by the colonies, were enacted to change the status of vagrants or wanders living on the land into residential labour status to prevent any crime risks associated with the wandering population.

Apartheid period 

During the apartheid period, racial segregation and anti-black policies were used to preserve white rule of the country. Zoning laws controlled movement and places of residence for black people, forcing them into black townships in the white-ruled cities. Visible homelessness was not allowed on the streets, so those who were homeless due to apartheid policies moved into shack settlements.

Natives Land Act 1913, known as the Black Land Act, legalised the use of racial distinction that denied rural black farmers access to land. Formed forced 'scheduled areas' that prevented the buying and selling of land to make any profit. It encouraged segregation, controlled movement, and spatially segregated residence within urban areas, and expanded throughout the apartheid. From this piece of legislation, more policies and legislation of racial segregation were enacted, limiting areas for blacks to live, forcing them into townships. The Native Land Act was the first piece of legislation to enforce territorial segregation and was the beginning of racial segregation in institutionalising it into South African legislation.

In 1927, the first township called Langa was founded in Cape Town. In the 1950s, townships of Nyanga and Guglethu were developed and increased in size.

Severe housing shortages in 1968 led to overcrowding and people constructed informal illegal settlements throughout the cities.

Causes 

Homelessness is shaped by social and economic insecurity which is worsened by informal housing and lack of legislation by the government. Financial pressure put on those living on the street is worsened as they have no ability to accumulate wealth, unlike the shack population.

Even with improving economy unemployment is still at 27%, contributing to homelessness.High rates of migration into urban areas whereby the government is unable to cope with the influx. Post-apartheid, free movement of non-white South Africans into areas that were restricted to them, resulting in not enough employment opportunities available.

Prevalence

Demographics 

There is a lack of consensus on the total number of homeless people living on the street. The Human Sciences Research Council (HSRC) state that there is an estimate between 100,000 and 200,000 nationwide living on the streets.

On the streets are typically street children or single adults not whole families. The street homeless population is predominantly black and male. There is a higher prevalence of men on the street, while in the shack population there is a larger female population. A profile of homeless people in Cape Town found that there were three times more males than females living in homeless shelters.

Rural areas have a higher proportion of homeless than in cities whereby a larger percentage of rural population is poorer than metropolitan areas.

Street Children 
Large migration of street children across borders into South Africa originally come from other bordering countries such as Zimbabwe, this migration occurrence is an increasing situation facing homeless children.  

A high percentage also come from urban townships compared to the higher rate of adults coming from rural areas. They are forced to leave as there is not enough resources to support them in poverty stricken living spaces.

Street Children suffer physical and psychological abuse and often develop a substance use disorder.

Advocacy response 
‘Surfers not street children’ is an advocacy group based in a city called Durban teach street kids how to surf in order to help them to foster connectedness. Its aim is to help them with psychological issues, caused by difficult childhoods.

Government response 
There is no specific governmental policy to protect the homeless. A 2003 report found that there was no direct national housing plan for people who lived on the streets, but policy falls predominantly under the Housing and the Social Welfare sectors. Public spending has gone towards supporting shelters for the homeless, however it is only remedial and not a long-term solution.

In 1994 in a post-apartheid period, the Department of Housing aimed to provide a million houses over the next five years. To help alleviate homelessness, the provision of shelter to transition into more permanent living space was implemented by the department of housing as a result of 1994 White Paper on a New Housing and Policy Strategy for South Africa.

Literature
Child homelessness in South Africa has been portrayed in the novel Thirteen Cents by K. Sello Duiker.

Homelessness in South African cities has been portrayed in art in a controversial piece titled Birds in a Cornfield.

See also
 Poverty in Africa
 Bergie

References

South Africa
Housing in South Africa
Social issues in South Africa